Šilutė airfield (ICAO code: EYSI) is a former Lithuanian Air Force airfield located in Western Lithuania,  east of Šilutė. It was used for glider pilot training since the 1950s; today it is mainly used by ultralight aircraft and gliders.

Airports in Lithuania
Šilutė